Le Deunff or Le Deunf is a surname deriving from the Breton "deuñv" (cf. Deuñv), meaning son-in-law.

Le Deunff may refer to:

  - French singer-songwriter

References

External links
Distribution of the surname Deunff in France

Breton-language surnames